Booz may refer to:

Booz (surname), a surname (including a list of people with the name)
 Strategy&, formerly known as Booz & Company, a global management consulting firm now part of PricewaterhouseCoopers
Booz Allen Hamilton, a global management consulting firm and US government contractor 
Edwin G. Booz, American businessman 
Ludovic Booz (born 1940), Haitian artist
the Greek form of Boaz, a rich landowner mentioned in the Biblical book of Ruth

See also
Booze (disambiguation)